Termas del Daymán (which means Hot Springs of Daymán) is a resort and populated centre in the Salto Department of northwestern Uruguay.

Geography
The river Río Daymán flows along the south limits of the resort, with the bridge at Paso de la Piedras linking it with the Paysandú Department.

Population
In 2011 Termas del Daymán had a population of 356 permanent inhabitants.
  
Source: Instituto Nacional de Estadística de Uruguay

References

External links
INE map of Termas del Daymán
Tourist information for Termas del Daymán
Viajando Por Uruguay, Termas del Daymán

Populated places in the Salto Department
Spa towns in Uruguay